Gryllus veletis, commonly known as the spring field cricket, is abundant throughout eastern North America. G. veletis is a solitary, aggressive, omnivorous, burrow-inhabiting species of cricket. This species is commonly confused with Gryllus pennsylvanicus (fall field cricket), as they inhabit the same geographical area. However, the two species are easily distinguished through examination of life history, ovipositor and behavioural differences. Predators of G. veletis include American toads, wild turkeys, red-tailed hawks, wolf spiders and red-backed salamanders.

Identification
Adult body length measures approximately 22.0 mm (0.87 inches). Males of this species are black with dark brown or black appendages. Females are similar in colour and have a dark brown ovipositor, measuring approximately 14 mm (0.55 inches). Female colouration differs from males as they have lighter, more reddish legs.

All species of field crickets generally look similar, with minor distinctions in morphological characteristics (i.e. coloration, ovipositor length, etc.) aiding in species identification. However, the male cricket's song play an important role in species identification. For an individual cricket, the species specific song helps distinguish mates and conspecifics from other species of crickets that might reside in the area. A recording of the spring field cricket's song can be heard here.

Natural history

Distribution
Gryllus veletis is abundant throughout eastern North America. It ranges from southern Canada to northern Georgia, and as far west as Washington and Oregon G. veletis occurs in the same areas as G. pennsylvanicus but the spring field cricket does not reach as far north as Nova Scotia, Canada. G. veletis can be found in disturbed habitats such as old fields, and weedy roadsides.

Life cycle and mating behaviour
Spring field crickets are sexually mature from late May to early August. Males of the species attract sexually receptive females by acoustic signals, known as stridulation. This process occurs by rubbing two rigid veins on the wings against one another. One vein is a scraper (smooth surface), the other a file (rough surface). The wings are held at a 45 degree angle above the thorax to amplify the sound.
Calling tends to peak at sunrise and lasts between 1.3 and 1.8 hours per night. However, if nighttime temperatures drop below 10 °C (50 °F), calling will switch to the daytime. At 29 °C (85 °F), the cricket will call at 120–370 chirps per minute, in a series of 3 to 5-pulse chirps. When a female is within the vicinity of a male’s territory, a quieter song (known as a courtship song) is used to reduce the risk of predation and attraction of male competitors. Both males and females have directional hearing. Tympanums on the front legs pick up the vibrations created by the chirps. Depending on the strength, and on which leg the vibration is received, the location of the caller can be determined.

Once mating occurs, females use their ovipositor to lay eggs into a soil substrate. The eggs will mature between June and September. The immature spring field cricket will continue to develop into a late-instar nymph and overwinter in this stage until emergence as adults in late May. G. veletis therefore undergoes one generation per year.

Human impact
Spring field crickets are often grouped with the other species of field crickets when discussing their possible impacts on humans.

Field crickets, including G. veletis, are generally omnivorous scavengers. Their diet normally consists of plants, both fresh and decaying, other dead insects and in some cases predation of other field crickets or live insects may occur. An example of field cricket predation is seen in the consumption of fly pupae, which helps reduce the population of flies, often viewed as pests by humans. Consumption of plant matter helps ensure that fallen leaves and other material does not accumulate. Along with other scavengers (i.e. earthworm, beetles, etc.) decomposition of plants into fertile soil helps maintain a balanced ecosystem in forests and fields.

Unlike house crickets (Acheta domesticus), field crickets are not able to adapt to a residential environment due to constraints in their life history traits and consequently, the insect will not live through the winter. Though field crickets are not normally found in home environments, they may invade a home to seek refuge from poor weather, attraction to light, or in search of foodstuffs (i.e. grains, seeds, etc.). Entrance can be gained through small cracks and crevices leading into a building. Once inside, damage to nylon, wool, plastic and leather fabrics may occur. The field cricket does not consume these materials, but "cuts out" a path through which it may pass. The human inhabitant may be aggravated by the field cricket's nocturnal chirping.

References

External links
Find Bugs on the Web
University of Florida Entomology and Nematology
NatureServe Explorer

veletis
Orthoptera of North America
Insects described in 1960